Marcus Hansson (born 18 October 1969) is a Swedish former professional motocross racer. He won the 1994 500cc Grand Prix Motocross World Championship.

Born in Borås, Sweden, Hansson rode a Honda to win the F.I.M. 500cc motocross world championship in 1994, defeating Jacky Martens and Joël Smets. He retired from racing after being injured in a supercross race in 1995. Hansson was the last Swedish rider to win a motocross world championship.

References

External links 
 Marcus Hansson Official Web Site 

Living people
1969 births
People from Borås
Swedish motocross riders
Sportspeople from Västra Götaland County